Sdach Domrei Sar is a 1970 Khmer film directed by actress Dy Saveth and stars Vann Vannak and Dy Saveth herself. The film has been remade again in 2005.

Cast 
Vann Vannak
Dy Saveth

Soundtrack 
Jao Luoch Jet by Sinn Si Samouth and Ros Serey Sothear

References 
 

1970 films
Cambodian drama films
Khmer-language films